Anthony Eisley (January 19, 1925 – January 29, 2003) was an American actor best known as one of the detective leads, Tracy Steele, in the ABC/Warner Brothers television series Hawaiian Eye. Early in his career, he was credited as Fred Eisley and later was sometimes billed as Tony Eisley.

Biography
Born Frederick Glendinning Eisley in Philadelphia, Pennsylvania, his father was a general sales manager for a large corporation.

Stage work
Following service in the United States Navy, he took drama classes at the University of Miami in Coral Gables, Florida, and then landed his first acting job in a Pennsylvania stock company production of A Slight Case of Murder.  Eisley also acted in touring company productions of Mister Roberts, Picnic, and The Desperate Hours.

Early career
His first on-screen role was as a military policeman in the 1952 movie Fearless Fagan.  In 1953, he made his first appearance on television. In 1958, he was cast in the  episode "The Trial" of the American Civil War drama Gray Ghost with Tod Andrews.  In 1957, Eisley played Joe Foss in the episode "Jose Foss, Devilbird" of the military television series Navy Log. Foss was a World War II Medal of Honor winner who later became the governor of South Dakota and an American sportsman. Eisley was in the 1959 Roger Corman film The Wasp Woman, which he described as "a hell of a lot of fun". 

Eisley's big break was being discovered in a Pasadena production of Who Was That Lady I Saw You With? where he was signed to a contract with Warner Bros. In the days of Tab, Ty, and Rock, Warner Bros. did not want a leading man with the name of "Fred" so they changed his first name to "Anthony". In 1959, Eisley played Carter Henry (as Fred Eisley), The Young Philadelphians (1959).

Hawaiian Eye
Eisley is best known for his starring role in the series Hawaiian Eye, which aired from 1959 to 1963. After scouts saw him in the play Who Was That Lady?, Warner Bros. signed him to a contract.  Eisley changed his name from Fred to Anthony at the request of  the studio. Anthony had thought he would play a comedian but Warner Brothers Television placed him in a suave private eye role in Hawaiian Eye.  Eisley said that he left after the third season to be replaced by Troy Donahue as a hotel social director, Philip Barton. In the two previous seasons, Donahue had portrayed the detective Sandy Winfield, II, on another ABC/WB series, Surfside 6, set on a houseboat in Miami Beach. Donahue was eleven years Eisley's junior.

When a Los Angeles Times television critic attacked Hawaiian Eye, Eisley penned a reply that was printed in the critic's column on December 7, 1960: "I too would like to see more food for thought on television. I have children whose viewpoints will be largely affected in certain areas by their many hours gazing at the one-eyed monster. But our world is solemn enough as it is. I'd hate to limit them -- or myself -- to a leisure-time diet devoid of laughter, adventure and romance."

During his Warner Brothers period, Eisley also appeared in Portrait of a Mobster (1961).

Support of mandatory school prayer
In 1964, Eisley acted as master of ceremonies at a "Project Prayer" rally attended by 2,500 people at the Shrine Auditorium in Los Angeles. The gathering sought to flood the United States Congress with letters in support of mandatory school prayer, following two decisions in 1962 and 1963 by the United States Supreme Court, which struck down mandatory school prayer as conflicting with the Establishment Clause of the First Amendment to the United States Constitution.

Eisley declared at the Project Prayer rally that the United States was facing "an ideological crisis. Movie stars and the stars of the entertainment world will tell you what you can do about it. Everything will be from the heart." Eisley was joined at the event by Walter Brennan, on whose series The Real McCoys he had once been a guest star, Rhonda Fleming, Lloyd Nolan, Dale Evans, Pat Boone, and Gloria Swanson. Eisley added that John Wayne, Ronald Reagan, Roy Rogers, Mary Pickford, Jane Russell, Ginger Rogers, and Pat Buttram would also have attended the rally if their schedules had not been in conflict.

Syndicated columnist Drew Pearson claimed in his "Washington Merry-Go-Round" column that Project Prayer had "backstage ties" to the anti-Communist John Birch Society. Pearson noted that the principal author of the prayer decisions, Chief Justice Earl Warren, was a Republican former Governor of California and that most mainline denominations had endorsed the Court's rulings.

Political views
Eisley supported Barry Goldwater in the 1964 United States presidential election.

Later career
Eisley appeared as a Soviet agent in an Armed Forces training film Espionage Target: You made in 1964. In 1965, Eisley was cast as an attorney in an anti-pornography institutional film entitled "Printed Poison"; produced by the "Citizens For Decency" movement.

Eisley co-starred as character Clint Braden, suitor to the Nancy Kovack character of Nellie Bly, in the 1966 film Frankie and Johnny. He also played Ben Mitchell in the 1968 musical film Star!. He also appeared three times on CBS's Perry Mason during the final three seasons of that series. In his second guest appearance in 1964 he played murder victim Vince Rome in "The Case of the Missing Button." In the same year he appeared albeit briefly in a strong Series 3 episode of Combat!, “The Gift Of Hope”.

Eisley guest-starred in an episode of the ABC religious drama series Going My Way and in the title role of The Outer Limits episode The Brain of Colonel Barham. He appeared six times in the 1967-1970 revival of Dragnet; in one segment he played a corrupt policeman and once he played an attempted murderer. During the eight-year run of ABC's The F.B.I., Eisley made 17 appearances as an agent.

Eisley was a guest as a villain in an episode of The Wild Wild West, with his former Hawaiian Eye co-star Robert Conrad. In 1970, he guest-starred in an episode of The Silent Force.

In 1973, he appeared as Ross Nelson, newscaster at Mary's Channel 8 competition, in the Season 4 episode "WJM Tries Harder" on The Mary Tyler Moore Show. He had appeared with Mary Tyler Moore years before in "The Lady and the Tiger and the Lawyer," a 1964 episode of The Dick Van Dyke Show.

His most memorable role in film was as Griff in The Naked Kiss (1964), Sam Fuller's controversial attack on alleged American small town hypocrisy.  Eisley became known as a cult schlock star for his appearances in Lightning Bolt (1966), The Navy vs. the Night Monsters (1966), Journey to the Center of Time (1967), The Mighty Gorga (1969), Dracula vs. Frankenstein (1971), The Doll Squad (1975), Monstroid (1980) and Deep Space (1988).

Death
Anthony Eisley died of heart failure ten days after his 78th birthday, on January 29, 2003, in Woodland Hills, California. Eisley married Judith Tubbs in 1951.  They remained married until her death January 9th, 1994 and had four children.

Filmography

References

External links
"Anthony Eisley, 78; Television Detective and B-Movie Actor" - Los Angeles Times obituary

 (as Fred Eisley)

1925 births
2003 deaths
American male film actors
American male television actors
Male actors from Philadelphia
Male actors from Los Angeles
Burials at Forest Lawn Memorial Park (Hollywood Hills)
Warner Bros. contract players
20th-century American male actors
Pennsylvania Republicans
California Republicans
American Christians
Conservatism in the United States